Ghulām Khān (Pashto/) is a town in North Waziristan, Khyber Pakhtunkhwa, Pakistan. Ghulam Khan is on the border between Pakistan and Afghanistan. It is the third most important border crossing point between Pakistan and Afghanistan, after Chaman and Torkham.

The border opened for trade between Pakistan and Afghanistan on 9 March 2018.

On 21 September 2008, as an indication of escalating tensions between the nations, Pakistani forces fired warning shots at American aircraft after they crossed into Pakistan's territory in the area of Saidgai, in North Waziristan's Ghulam Khan region.

References

 
Populated places in North Waziristan
Afghanistan–Pakistan border crossings
Waziristan